The following outline is provided as an overview of and topical guide to Tripura:

Tripura – state in Northeast India. The third-smallest state in the country, it covers 10,491 km2 (4,051 sq mi) and is bordered by Bangladesh (East Bengal) to the north, south, and west, and the Indian states of Assam and Mizoram to the east. The Bengali Hindu people form the ethno-linguistic majority in Tripura.

General reference

Names 
 Common English name: Tripura
 Pronunciation: 
 Official English name(s): Tripura
 Nickname(s): 
 Adjectival(s)
 Tripuri
 Tripuran
 Demonym(s)
 Tripuris
 Tripurans

Rankings (amongst India's states) 

 by population: 22nd
 by area (2011 census): 27th
 by crime rate (2015): 25th
 by gross domestic product (GDP) (2014): 23rd
by Human Development Index (HDI): 
by life expectancy at birth: 
by literacy rate:

Geography of Tripura 

Geography of Tripura
 Tripura is: an Indian state, and one of the Seven Sister States
 Population of Tripura: 3,671,032 (2011)
 Area of Tripura: 10,491.69 km2 (4,050.86 sq mi) 
 Atlas of Tripura

Location of Tripura 
 Tripura is situated within the following regions:
 Northern Hemisphere
 Eastern Hemisphere
 Eurasia
 Asia
 South Asia
 India
 Northeastern India
 Seven Sister States
 Time zone:  Indian Standard Time (UTC+05:30)

Environment of Tripura

Natural geographic features of Tripura 

 Highest point: Betlingchhip

Regions of Tripura

Ecoregions of Tripura

Administrative divisions of Tripura

Districts of Tripura 

Districts of Tripura
 Dhalai district
 Gomati district
 Khowai district
 North Tripura district
 Sepahijala district
 South Tripura district
 Unakoti district
 West Tripura district

Municipalities of Tripura 

 Cities of Tripura
 Capital of Tripura: Agartala
 Amarpur, Tripura
 Dhalai
 Khowai
 Teliamura
 Unakoti

Demography of Tripura 

Demographics of Tripura

Government and politics of Tripura 

Politics of Tripura

 Form of government: Indian state government (parliamentary system of representative democracy)
 Capital of Tripura: Agartala
 Elections in Tripura
 Tripura Tribal Areas Autonomous District Council (TTAADC)

Union government in Tripura 
 Rajya Sabha members from Tripura
 Tripura Pradesh Congress Committee
 Indian general election, 2009 (Tripura)
 Indian general election, 2014 (Tripura)

Branches of the government of Tripura 

Government of Tripura

Executive branch of the government of Tripura 

 Head of state: Governor of Tripura, 
 Head of government: Chief Minister of Tripura,

Legislative branch of the government of Tripura 

Tripura Legislative Assembly

Judicial branch of the government of Tripura

Law and order in Tripura 

 Law enforcement in Tripura
 Tripura Police

History of Tripura 

History of Tripura

History of Tripura, by period 

 Twipra Kingdom
 Tripura (princely state)
 Manikya Dynasty
 Tripuri Kings

Prehistoric Tripura

Ancient Tripura

Medieval Tripura

Colonial Tripura

Contemporary Tripura

History of Tripura, by region

History of Tripura, by subject

Culture of Tripura 

Culture of Tripura
 Architecture of Tripura
 Cuisine of Tripura
 Tripuri cuisine
 Tripuri dress
 Languages of Tripura
 Kokborok language
 Kokborok literature
 Monuments in Tripura
 Monuments of National Importance in Tripura
 State Protected Monuments in Tripura
 World Heritage Sites in Tripura

Art in Tripura 

 Tripuri dances
 Music of Tripura
 Musical instruments of Tripura

People of Tripura 

 People from Tripura

Religion in Tripura 

Religion in Tripura
 Christianity in Tripura

Sports in Tripura 

Sports in Tripura
 Cricket in Tripura
 Tripura Cricket Association
 Tripura cricket team
 Football in Tripura
 Tripura Football Association
 Tripura football team

Symbols of Tripura 

Symbols of Tripura
 State animal:
 State bird:
 State flower:
 State seal: Seal of Tripura
 State tree:

Economy and infrastructure of Tripura 

 Tourism in Tripura

Education in Tripura 

Education in Tripura
 Institutions of higher education in Tripura

Health in Tripura 

Health in Tripura
 Healthcare

See also 
 Outline of India

References

External links 

 
 News website
 

Tripura
Tripura
 1